Thomas Edward Donegan (8 April 1930 – 1994) was a Scottish footballer who played for Dumbarton and Arbroath. Donegan died in Glasgow in 1994, at the age of 64.

References

1930 births
1994 deaths
Scottish footballers
Dumbarton F.C. players
Arbroath F.C. players
Scottish Football League players
Association football forwards